Joseph Nkrumah Buabeng known professionally as Nero X is a Ghanaian singer and songwriter. He is best known for his hit single "Osey".

Early life and education 
Joseph Buabeng was born and raised in Lagos Town a suburb in the Western region of Ghana. Nero X attended Takoradi Secondary School and later attended Takoradi Technical University.

Music career 
He started his music journey in 2005 as a member of the group '2Unit' with fellow musician Ayesem. They would later contest in the Nescafe African Revelations reality show that same year. In 2010 Nero X emerged the second runner up of ‘Star Grab the Mic’ organized by Empire Entertainment. 

In 2013, he won in the maiden edition of Viasat 1 TV's Born Starz. Nero X released his first single ‘Osey’ in 2015 which topped major Ghanaian music charts. He will go on to release Otan, Nyame Dadaw, Nyimpa Nua among others.

Nero X has worked with artistes such as Castro, Teephlow, Nana Quame, KK Fosu, Guru, Okyeame Kwame, FlowKing Stone, Tinny, etc.

Videography

Awards and nominations

Vodafone Ghana Music Awards

RTC Western Music Awards

Ghana Music Awards UK

MTN 4stye Music Video Awards

Discography

Major Singles

References

External links 

Facebook

Twitter
Living people
1986 births
People from Western Region (Ghana)
21st-century Ghanaian male singers
21st-century Ghanaian singers
Ghanaian highlife musicians